Pyrularia pubera is a shrub in the  sandalwood family which grows through the eastern United States from New York to Alabama, being mostly found in the Appalachian mountains. It is commonly referred to as buffalo nut or oil nut. It grows up to 4m tall mostly in the shade of other trees. It is a parasitic plant, specifically a hemiparasite which while still photosynthetic, will also parasitize the roots of other plants around it. It can parasitize many hosts.

References

Santalaceae